The 1966–67 Scottish Inter-District Championship was a rugby union competition for Scotland's district teams.

This season saw the 14th Scottish Inter-District Championship.

South won the competition with 2 wins and a draw.

1966-67 League Table

Results

Round 1

Glasgow District: 

South:

Round 2

 North and Midlands: 

Edinburgh District:

Round 3

Glasgow District:

Edinburgh District:

Round 4

South: 

North and Midlands:

Round 5

Edinburgh District: 

South:

Round 6

Glasgow District: 

North and Midlands:

References

1966–67 in Scottish rugby union
Scottish Inter-District Championship seasons